Katie Boland (born 1987 or 1988) is a Canadian actress, writer, director, and producer. She began her career as a child actress in film and television and has since branched out into adult roles, in addition to writing, directing, and producing her own projects.

Early life 
Boland was born and raised in Toronto, and began her career as a child actor and her first role was in the CBS miniseries The Third Twin (1997), opposite Kelly McGillis and Jason Gedrick.

Career
In her youth, Boland became well known for her roles in the Canadian children's television shows Noddy and The Zack Files. Since subsequently starred in the drama miniseries Terminal City (2005). In 2007, Boland starred as Christine in the Hallmark Channel original film The Note; she also starred in its 2009 sequel Taking a Chance on Love.In 2008, Boland appeared in Atom Egoyan's Adoration, and in 2009, she was chosen by Elle as one of three Canadians to watch. The following year, she played a supporting role in Michael Goldbach's Daydream Nation (2010). In 2012, she was featured in the Paul Thomas Anderson film The Master.

In 2013, Boland wrote, produced, and starred in the Hulu web series Long Story, Short, co-created with her mother Gail Harvey, who also directed it. The series was filmed in the house where she grew up and was based on her personal essays "The Summer I Lost My Mind." For her role in the series, Boland won a Canadian Screen Award in 2014. She also won the Best Actress award at the inaugural Vancouver Web Series Festival, among other nominations, for her performance in Long Story, Short. Later that same year, she was chosen as one of Playback's annual "10 To Watch".

From 2013 to 2015, Boland starred in the recurring role of Clarissa on the hit CW series Reign. In 2015, Boland played a supporting role in Born To Be Blue (2015), alongside Ethan Hawke, which premiered at the Toronto International Film Festival, and also starred as part of an ensemble cast in the film People Hold On, which was nominated for a Canadian Screen Award.

In 2017, she starred in the low-budget thriller film Cardinals opposite Sheila McCarthy, Grace Glowicki, and Noah Reid. The film premiered in the Discovery section of the 2017 Toronto International Film Festival.

In 2016, Boland was awarded a grant by bravoFACT to direct and star in a short film, which she also wrote, titled Lolz-Ita. The film is about the life of a naïve but internet savvy 22-year-old who becomes a celebrity on Instagram. Gail Harvey (her mother) and Lauren Collins co-produced the film alongside Boland. In 2017, it was announced that Lolz-Ita would screen at the TIFF Bell Lightbox as part of the Toronto International Film Festival's Share Her Journey campaign to "champion female storytellers". The film was also selected to screen at the 24th annual Austin Film Festival.

In 2020, production began on Boland's full-length directorial debut, We're All in This Together. Based on the novel of the same name by Amy Jones, the film also stars Boland as twins Finn and Nicki Parker alongside Martha Burns and Alisha Newton. Boland wrote the screenplay adaptation. The film was released on 6 July 2021.

In addition to acting, screenwriting, and directing, Boland has written a novel and works as an occasional journalist for the various media publications, including the Toronto Star, BlogTO, SheDoesTheCity, and TChad Quarterly. Boland's written work focuses mainly on women's issues and relationships.

Personal life 
Boland's mother is award-winning Canadian director Gail Harvey. Together, they own a production company, Straight Shooters. Her father is journalist Kevin Boland and her brother, who goes by the stage name Spark Houston, is a rapper.

The documentary Paper Promises (2010) is about her grandfather Larry Harvey, a Country musician, and was directed by her uncle Shane Harvey.

Filmography

Film

Television

References

External links

 
 
 Katie Boland at Tribute.ca

20th-century Canadian actresses
21st-century Canadian actresses
Actresses from Toronto
Canadian child actresses
Canadian film actresses
Canadian television actresses
Living people
Year of birth missing (living people)